"War Song" is a 1972 single credited to Neil Young & Graham Nash, backed by The Stray Gators. It was released in support of George McGovern's 1972 presidential campaign, who was running against incumbent President Richard Nixon. Young had already voiced his opinions of Nixon two years prior with "Ohio" while a member of Crosby, Stills, Nash & Young, and once again tried to make an impact with a protest song. Despite his and Nash's intentions, the single failed to make a serious impression.  

Cash Box described the song as a "philosophical/political opus in the groove of [the Crosby, Stills, Nash & Young song] 'Ohio.'"

The single itself soon went out of print. Warner Brothers released the song on their 1974 loss leader Series album Hard Goods (a promotional series used primarily to promote rock acts on the label at the time).  After that, "War Song" would remain unreleased in any other format until June 2009, when it was released on CD, DVD, and Blu-ray on a box set by Neil Young called The Archives Vol. 1 1963–1972.

Charts

Weekly charts

See also
 List of anti-war songs

References

1972 songs
1972 singles
Anti-war songs
Neil Young songs
Graham Nash songs
Reprise Records singles
Protest songs
Songs written by Neil Young
Political songs
Songs written by Graham Nash
Song recordings produced by Neil Young
Song recordings produced by Elliot Mazer